Moin is a village located in the Gevgelija Municipality of North Macedonia. It is located west of Geveglija, close to the Greek border.

Demographics
As of the 2021 census, Moin had 312 residents with the following ethnic composition:
Macedonians 300
Serbs 5
Persons for whom data are taken from administrative sources 5
Others 2

According to the 2002 census, the village had a total of 317 inhabitants. Ethnic groups in the village include:
Macedonians 298
Serbs 16
Aromanians 3

References

Villages in Gevgelija Municipality